El Carnavalazo was a military coup in Ecuador led by Guillermo Rodriguez Lara, that deposed the government of Velasco Ibarra on 15 February 1972, ending the fifth and last  of the velasquism presidencies. This event was popularly called "Carnavalazo" because it happened during the Ecuadorian carnival.

Background 
In 1968, José María Velasco Ibarra was democratically elected for a fifth term (1968-1972). Democratic rule didn't last long, with Velasco assuming dictatorial powers in 1970 with military support.  A failed military coup against his regime took place in 1971, causing Velasco to appoint Guillermo Rodríguez Lara "El Bombita" as the new army commander. In the same year, the president Velasco made the Hydrocarbon Law, that recovers the sovereignty of Ecuadorian oil - proclaiming it as a national state patrimony.

In this political crisis, Velasco's regime promised elections for June 1972, which would make his mandate end on August 31. One of the likely candidates was the former mayor of Guayaquil Assad Bucaram, considered the favorite candidate.

Coup 
Publicly, 1972 began peacefully, with Velasco and army chief Bombita celebrating a new year with a toast. National debates took place about two topics: the possible triumph of Assad Bucaram in the elections and the country's oil future. In early February 1972, plans to overthrow Velasco during carnival circulated in the military circle.

On the night of February 15, shrove Tuesday, a bloodless military coup takes power and appoints Rodriguez Lara as president. The coup surprised Velasco in Quito, who traveled to Guayaquil to denounce by a television broadcast this action. Velasco was arrested by navy officers and deported to Panama the next day. After the coup, a three‐man junta called the Revolutionary Nationalist Government Is established.

Most Ecuadorian citizens have not heard of the coup. The radio stations only played music and three TV stations from Guayaquil went off the air. The intention of the military takeover was the oil administration. With a imminent oil boom - The military did not want the oil riches to be managed by a populist candidate or traditional oligarchy, with that preventing the planned electoral process.

References 

Military coups in Ecuador
1972 in Ecuador